is a former Japanese swimmer who competed in the 1984 Summer Olympics.

References

1960 births
Living people
Japanese male freestyle swimmers
Olympic swimmers of Japan
Swimmers at the 1984 Summer Olympics
Asian Games medalists in swimming
Asian Games gold medalists for Japan
Asian Games bronze medalists for Japan
Swimmers at the 1978 Asian Games
Medalists at the 1978 Asian Games
20th-century Japanese people